The ethnic or national origin of explorer Christopher Columbus (1451–1506) has been a source of speculation since the 19th century. The consensus among historians is that Columbus's family was from the coastal region of Liguria, that he spent his boyhood and early youth in the Republic of Genoa, in Genoa, in Vico Diritto, and that he subsequently lived in Savona, where his father Domenico moved in 1470. Much evidence derives from documents concerning Columbus's immediate family connections in Genoa and opinions voiced by contemporaries on his Genoese origins, which few dispute.

Other hypotheses exist, none of which are broadly accepted. An international DNA study aimed at determining Columbus's origins began in 2021.

Genoese origin

Documents 
In a 1498 deed of primogeniture, Columbus writes:

Many historians, including a Spanish scholar, Angel de Altolaguirre, affirm the document's authenticity; others believe it apocryphal. Some believe that the fact that it was produced in court, during a lawsuit among the heirs of Columbus, in 1578, does not strengthen the case for its authenticity.

A letter from Columbus, dated 2 April 1502, to the Bank of Saint George, the oldest and most reputable of Genoa's financial institutions, begins with the words:

Though some people consider this letter unreliable, the majority of scholars believe it genuine. Examination by graphologists testifies in favour of authenticity. The letter is one of a group of documents entrusted by Columbus to a Genoese friend, after the negative experiences of his third voyage, before setting out on his fourth.

In the spring of 1502, Columbus collected notarized copies of all the writings concerned with his rights to the discovery of new lands. He sent these documents to Nicolò Oderico, ambassador of the Republic of Genoa. To Oderico he also gave "the letter to the Bank of Saint George", in which he announced that he was leaving the bank one-tenth of his income, with a recommendation for his son Diego. Oderico returned to Genoa and delivered the letter to the bank. The bank replied on 8 December 1502, lauding the gesture of their "renowned fellow-citizen" towards his "native land". The reply, unfortunately, never reached its destination; Columbus, back in Castile after his fourth voyage, complained about this in another letter to Ambassador Oderico, dated 27 December 1504, and promptly annulled the bequest.

The first letter was preserved in the archives of the Bank of Saint George until it was taken over by the municipality of Genoa; the other three remained in the Oderico family archives until 1670, when they were donated to the Republic of Genoa. After the fall of the Republic, they passed to the library of one of its last senators, Michele Cambiaso, and were finally acquired by the city of Genoa.  There are also public and notarial acts (more than a hundred) — copies of which are conserved in the archives of Genoa and Savona — regarding Columbus's father, Columbus himself, his grandfather, and his relatives.

Another doubt remains to be settled: that is, whether or not all of the documents cited concern the Christopher Columbus who was later to become Cristóbal Colón, admiral of the Ocean Sea in Spanish territory. The list of contemporary ambassadors and historians unanimous in the belief that Columbus was Genoese could suffice as proof, but there is something more: a document dated 22 September 1470 in which the criminal judge convicts Domenico Colombo. The conviction is tied to the debt of Domenico — together with his son Christopher (explicitly stated in the document) — toward a certain Girolamo del Porto. In the will dictated by Admiral Christopher Columbus in Valladolid before he died, the authentic and indisputable document which we have today, the dying navigator remembers this old debt, which had evidently not been paid. There is, in addition, the act drawn in Genoa on 25 August 1479 by a notary, Girolamo Ventimiglia. This act is known as the Assereto document, after the scholar who found it in the State Archives in Genoa in 1904. It involves a lawsuit over a sugar transaction on the Atlantic island Madeira. In it, young Christopher swore that he was a 27-year-old Genoese citizen resident in Portugal and had been hired to represent the Genoese merchants in that transaction. Here was proof that he had relocated to Portugal. It is important to bear in mind that at the time when Assereto traced the document, it would have been impossible to make an acceptable facsimile. Nowadays, with modern chemical processes, a document can be "manufactured", made to look centuries old if need be, with such skill that it may be difficult to prove it is a fake. In 1960, this was still impossible.

In addition to the two documents cited, there are others that confirm the identification of the Genoese Christopher Columbus, son of Domenico, with the admiral of Spain. An act dated 11 October 1496 says:
	

In a fourth notarial act, drawn in Savona on 8 April 1500, Sebastiano Cuneo, heir by half to his father Corrado, requested that Christopher and Giacomo (called Diego), the sons and heirs of Domenico Colombo, be summoned to court and sentenced to pay the price for two lands located in Legine. This document confirms Christoforo and Diego's absence from the Republic of Genoa with these exact words: "dicti conventi sunt absentes ultra Pisas et Niciam."
	 
A fifth notarial act, drawn in Savona on 26 January 1501, is more explicit. A group of Genoese citizens, under oath, said and say, together and separately and in every more valid manner and guise, that Christopher, Bartholomew and Giacomo Columbus, sons and heirs of the aforementioned Domenico, their father, have for a long time been absent from the city and the jurisdiction of Savona, as well as Pisa and Nice in Provence, and that they reside in the area of Spain, as was and is well known.
	 
Finally, there is a sixth document from the notary of Bartolomeo Oddino, drawn in Savona on 30 March 1515. With this notarial act, Leon Pancaldo, the well-known Savonese who would become one of the pilots for Magellan's voyage, sends his own father-in-law in his place as procurator for Diego Columbus, son of Admiral Christopher Columbus. The document demonstrates how the ties, in part economic, of the discoverer's family with Savona survived even his death.

The life of Admiral Christopher Columbus by his son Ferdinand 
A biography written by Columbus's son Ferdinand (in Spanish and translated into Italian), Historie del S. D. Fernando Colombo; nelle quali s'ha particolare, et vera relatione della vita, et de' fatti dell'Ammiraglio D. Christoforo Colombo, suo padre; Et dello scoprimento, ch'egli fece delle Indie Occidentali, dette Nuovo Mondo ("Accounts of His Lordship Ferdinand Columbus; among which there are particulars and a true relation of the life, and of the deeds of the Admiral, Sir Christopher Columbus, his father; and of the discovery, which he made, of the West Indies, called the New World," abbreviated as "The life of the Admiral Christopher Columbus by his son Ferdinand"), exists.
In it, Ferdinand claimed that his father was of Italian aristocracy. He describes Columbus to be a descendant of a Count Columbo of the Castle Cuccaro (Montferrat). Columbo was in turn said to be descended from a legendary Roman General Colonius. It is now widely believed that Christopher Columbus used this persona to ingratiate himself with the aristocracy, an elaborate illusion to mask a humble merchant background. Ferdinand dismissed the fanciful story that the Admiral descended from the Colonus mentioned by Tacitus. However, he refers to "those two illustrious Coloni, his relatives." According to Note 1, on page 287, these two "were corsairs not related to each other or to Christopher Columbus, one being Guillame de Casenove, nicknamed Colombo, Admiral of France in the reign of Louis XI". At the top of page 4, Ferdinand listed Nervi, Cogoleto, Bogliasco, Savona, Genoa and Piacenza (all inside the former Republic of Genoa) as possible places of origin. He also stated:

In chapter ii, Ferdinand accuses Agostino Giustiniani of telling lies about the discoverer:

In chapter v, he writes:

Ferdinand also says (chapter xi) that before he was declared admiral, his father used to sign himself "Columbus de Terra rubra," that is to say, Columbus of Terrarossa, a village or hamlet near Genoa. In another passage, Ferdinand says that his father went to Lisbon and taught his brother Bartholomew to construct sea charts, globes and nautical instruments; and sent this brother to England to make proposals to Henry VII of his desired voyage. Finally, Ferdinand says incidentally (chapter lxxii) that Christopher's brother, Bartholomew Columbus named the new settlement Santo Domingo in memory of their father, Domenico.

The publication of Historie has been used by historians as providing indirect evidence about the Genoese origin of Columbus.

The testimony of the ambassadors 
It is significant that no one protested at the court of Spain when in April 1501, in the feverish atmosphere of the discovery, Nicolò Oderico, ambassador of the Genoese Republic, after praising the Catholic Sovereigns, went on to say that they "discovered with great expenditure hidden and inaccessible places under the command of Columbus, our fellow-citizen, and having tamed wild barbarians and unknown peoples, they educated them in religion, manners and laws". Furthermore, two diplomats from Venice — no great friend of Genoa, indeed, a jealous rival — added the appellation "Genoese" to Columbus's name: the first, Angelo Trevisan, in 1501, the second, Gasparo Contarini, in 1525. In 1498, Pedro de Ayala, Spanish ambassador to the English court, mentioned John Cabot, "the discoverer, another Genoese, like Columbus". All these references were published, along with reproductions of some of the original documents, in the City of Genoa volume of 1931.

Support for the Genoese origin from contemporary European writers 
The historian Bartolomé de las Casas, whose father traveled with Columbus on his second journey and who personally knew Columbus's sons, writes in chapter 2 of his Historia de las Indias:

The historian Gonzalo Fernández de Oviedo y Valdés, writes that Domenico Colombo was the Admiral's father; and in chapter 2, book 3 of his Historia general y natural de las Indias:

Many contemporary writers agree that the discoverer was Genoese:

The Portuguese Rui de Pina wrote two works, Chronica d'El Rey, dom Affonso and Chronica d'El Rey, dom João II. It has been ascertained that the manuscripts had been completed before 1504, although they were published in the Eighteenth century. Chapter 66 in the second manuscript, "Descubrimiento das Ilhas de Castella per Collombo," explicitly states, "Christovan Colombo italiano."
In the 1513 edition of the Map of the New World from Ptolemy, it says: "This land with the adjacent islands was discovered by the Genoese Columbus, sent by the King of Castile."
The Turkish geographer Piri Ibn Haji Mehmed, known as Piri Reis, in his map of 1513, writes: "These coasts are called the coasts of the Antilles. They were discovered in the year 896 of the Arabic calendar. It is said that a Genoese infidel, Columbus by name, discovered the place."
Hernando Alonso de Herrera, in his anti-Aristotelian dissertation, completed in Salamanca in 1516, and published in Latin and Spanish, wrote: "Xristoval Colon ginoves."
In a Portuguese map of 1520, it is said: "Land of the Antipodes of the King of Castile, discovered by Christopher Columbus Genoese."
The German Peter von Bennewitz writes, in 1520, in the Typus Orbis Universalis: "In the year 1497 (sic) this land (America) with the adjacent islands was discovered by Columbus, a Genoese by mandate of the King of Castile."
The German Johannes Schöner states in the Globus of 1520: "This (island) produces gold, mastic, aloes, porcelain, etc. and ginger — Latitude of the island 440 miles — Longitude 880 — discovered by Christopher Columbus Genoese, captain of the King of Castile in the year of Our Lord 1492."
The Spaniard Francisco López de Gómara writes: "Christopher Columbus was originally from Cogurreo or Nervi, a village of Genoa, a very famous Italian city."
The Portuguese Garcia de Resende, poet and editor, writes: "Christouao Colombo, italiano."
The Swiss Heinrich Glarean (Loriti) writes: "To the west there is a land they call America. Two islands, Hispaniola and Isabella: which regions were travelled, along the coast, by the Spaniards, by the Genoese Columbus and by Amerigo Vespuzio."
The Spaniard Hieronymo Girava, who lived in the first half of the 16th century, writes: "Christoval Colon Genoese, great seaman and mediocre cosmographer."
The Portuguese João de Barros writes: "As all men declare, Christovão Colom was of Genoese nation, a man expert, eloquent and good Latinist, and very boastful in his affairs"; and: "As in this kingdom came Christopher Columbus Genoese, who had just discovered the western islands that now we call Antilles."
The German known as Giovanni Boemo Aubano, of the first half of the 16th century, writes: "Christoforo Palombo, Genoese, the year 1492."
The Flemish Abraham Ortelius, writes: "It seems to surpass the bounds of human wonder that all this hemisphere (that today is called America and, because of its immense extent, the New World) remained unknown to the ancients until the Christian year 1492, in which it was first discovered by Christopher Columbus, Genoese."
The Portuguese Damião de Góis, writes: "The Genoese Columbus, a man expert in nautical arts" ; and, in the index: "Columbi genuen- sis, alias Coloni commendatio." 
The Spaniard Nicolás Monardes, writes: "In the year 1492 our Spaniards were led by don Christoval Colon, native of Genoa, to discover the West Indies."
The German Laurentius Surius, writes: "There was at the court of the King of Spain a certain Christopher Columbus whose homeland was Genoa."
In 1579, for the Cristoph Pantin's edition, the yearbooks of the Genoese Senate were published, in Antwerp, edited by Petro Bizaro: Senatus Populique Genuensis rerum domi forisque gestarum historiae atque annales. Among what is written to celebrate many industrious Genoese men, you can read that: "cum Christophoro Columbo navalis scientiae absolutissima peritia apud omnem venturam posteritatem, juro optima aliqua ex parte conferri vel comparari possit."
The Portuguese Fernão Vaz Dourado in the Atlante of 1580, notes: "Land of the Antipodes of the King of Castile discovered by Christopher Columbus Genoese."
The Spaniard Alvaro Gomez, writes: "Thanks to the eager industry of Christopher Columbus Genoese, word was brought to our Sovereigns of an unknown world."
The Frenchman Gilbert Génebrard, writes: "Ferdinand, at the urging of his wife Isabella, Queen of Castile, Leòn and Aragon, sent Christopher Columbus Genoese to seek new land."
The Swiss Theodor Zwinger, who died in 1588, was the author of the Theatrum Humanae Vitae, Basle 1604. In the index we read: "Cristoforo Colono, or Colombo Genoese."
On an unspecified date, certainly prior to 1591, the Turk Basmagi Ibrahim published a book, written by a Turkish author who has remained anonymous, entitled Turich-i-Hind-i garbi iachod hadis-i-nev (History of the West Indies, in other words the New Story). The third chapter of this book dedicated to the discoverer of the "New World or New Land," states: "From the village of Nervi, which is among the Genoese possessions, a man who was born who had the name Christopher and the surname Columbus. Since he had completed journeys by land and by sea [...] he stayed on an island by the name of Madeira [...] under the domain of the wretched (sic) Portugal."
The Flemish Theodor De Bry, writes: "From everything it can be stated with certainty that it was first discovered by Christopher Columbus Genoese."
The Portuguese Gaspar Frutuoso, in a sixteenth-century manuscript entitled As Saudades da terra, printed by Alvaro Rodriguez Azevedo in 1873 in Funchal (Madeira), writes in the Anales of Porto Santo: "On this island the great Christovao Colombo, the Genoese, resided for some time."
The German David Chytraeus writes: "Primum Novum Orbem in occidente, omnibus antea ignotum et inaccessam... pervestigare et aperire... Christophorus Columbus Genesis, admirand ad omnen posteritatem ausu et industria coeperat."
In the volume published by the City of Genoa the testimony is cited of the historian Andres Bernaldez, who died in 1513. He was the author of a Historia de los Reyes Catolicos don Fernando y dona Isabel. In this work, belatedly published in Seville in 1869, it is written: "In the name of Almighty God, a man of the land of Genoa, a merchant of printed books who was called Christopher Columbus." Actually, in the original text of Bernaldez, it says "land of Milan". However, this is merely lack of precision. In the 15th century, the Republic of Genoa was alternately fully and legally dependent on the Duchy of Milan and the latter's satellite. The editor rightly interpreted the Milanese reference in the sense of Genoese origin.

Columbus's Genoese birth is confirmed by the works of the English Hakluyt (1601), of the Spaniard Antonio de Herrera (1612), the great Spanish dramatist Lope de Vega (1614), a paper manuscript dated 1626, conserved in Madrid's National Library, the works of the German Filioop Cluwer (1677), the German Giovanni Enrico Alsted (1649), the French Dionisio Petau (1724), and the Spaniard Luigi de Marmol (1667). This list represents the early writings of non-Italians. There were sixty-two Italian testimonies between 1502 and 1600. Of these fourteen are from Ligurian writers. It may be obvious, but not useless, to underline that the Venetians' (e.g. Trevisan's and Ramusio's) recognition of Columbus's Genoese birth constitutes a testimony as impartial as that of the Spaniards, French, and Portuguese.

Conformable to the testament in Seville (3 July 1539) is the evidence of Ferdinand Columbus, who states that his father was conterraneo (of the same country) with Mons. Agostino Giustiniani, who was, beyond all doubt, born at Genoa:

Other information 
Other testimony of contemporary or succeeding authors include:

A reference, dated 1492 by a court scribe Galindez, referred to Columbus as "Cristóbal Colón, genovés."
The historian Peter Martyr d'Anghiera, was the earliest of Columbus's chroniclers and was in Barcelona when Columbus returned from his first voyage. In his letter of May 14, 1493, addressed to Giovanni Borromeo, he referred to Columbus as Ligurian, Liguria being the Region where Genoa is located.
Michele da Cuneo from Savona, a friend of Columbus's (possibly from childhood), sailed with Columbus during the second voyage and wrote: "In my opinion, since Genoa was Genoa, there was never born a man so well equipped and expert in the art of navigation as the said lord Admiral."
Giambattista Strozzi, a Florentine merchant, reported in a letter sent from Cadiz on March 19, 1494: "On the 7th of this month there arrived here in safety twelve caravels which came from the new islands found by Columbus Savonese, Admiral of the Ocean, for the king of Castile, having come in twenty-five days from the said islands of the Antilles."
Cesáreo Fernández Duro in his book Colón y la Historia postuma, mentions the chronicler Alonso Estanquez, who has composed a Crónica de los reyes don Fernando y doña Isabel, before 1506, where he writes: "Cristobal Colón, genovés."
In 1507 Martin Waldseemüller published a world map, Universalis Cosmographia, which was the first to show North and South America as separate from Asia and surrounded by water. Below the island of Hispaniola, near the coast of Paria (Central America) he inserted the words: "Iste insule per Columbum genuensem almirantem ex ma[n]dato regis Castelle invent[a]e sunt" or "these islands have been discovered by the Genoese admiral Columbus by order of the king of Castile."
Witnesses in the 1511 and 1532 hearings in the Pleitos agreed that Columbus was from the Ligur. Another witness at the same hearing placed it more precisely, testifying, "I heard it said that [he] was from the seigneury of Genoa, from the city of Savona." 
Father Antonio de Aspa, a Hieronymite from the convent of Mejorada, between 1512 and 1524, wrote a report on Columbus's first voyage, drawn largely from the Decades of Peter Martyr d'Anghiera, in which he claimed that Columbus was Genoese. 
The Portuguese Jorge Reinel, in his map of 1519, writes the following words: "Xpoforum cõlombum genuensem." 
The German Simon Grynaeus, writes: "Christophorus natione Italicus, patria Genuensis, gente Columba."
D. Diego, a grandson of the admiral, was knight of the Order of Santiago, in the genealogy section, of 1535, says: "Paternal Grandparents / Christopher Columbus, a native of Saona near Genoa, / and Filipa Moniz, a native of Libon." In the same year, Pedro de Arana, a cousin of Columbus's Spanish mistress, testified that he knew Columbus was from Genoa. 
The Spaniard Alonzo de Santa Cruz, c. 1550, said Columbus was from Nervi.
The Spaniard Pedro Cieza de León writes that Columbus was originally from Savona.
In his Commentarius de Ophyra regione apud Divinam Scripturam Commemorata of 1561, the Portuguese geographer Gaspar Barreiros, reported that Columbus was "Ligurian." 
The Spaniard Jerónimo Zurita y Castro, writes: "Christopher Columbus, man, as he said, whose company had always been for the sea and its predecessors, so that was foreign born and raised in poverty and the banks of Genoa."
The Portuguese António Galvão, writes: "In the yeere 1492, in the time of Don Ferdinando king of Castile, he being at the siege of Granada, dispatched one Christopher Columbus a Genoway with three ships to goe and discouer Noua Spagna."
The Spaniard Gonzalo de Illescas, writes: "Christopher Columbus Genoese, was born at Nervi, a village near to Genoa."
The Spaniard Esteban de Garibay, humanist and historian, writes: "A man of the Italian nation, named Christopher Columbus, native of Cugurco (Cogoleto), or Nervi, village of Genoa."
The Portuguese João Matalio Metelo Sequano in 1580, writes that Columbus was born in the city of Genoa. 
The Frenchman Lancelot Voisin de La Popelinière, writes: "La plupart des princes chretiens, le nostre sur tous, l'Anglais, le Portugais, l'Espagnol mémes, n'avaient daigné préster sculement l'ouíe a l'ouverture que l'ltalien leur faisait."
The Spaniard Julián del Castillo, writes: "Christopher Columbus, an Italian, was originally from Cogurio (Cogoleto) or Nervi, village near to the famous city of Genoa."
The German Michael Neander, writes: "Christophoro Colombo Genuensi."
The Spaniard Gonzalo Argote de Molina clearly identified Albissola Marina as Columbus's birthplace.
Friar Juan de la Victoria, author of the 16th century, wrote a Catálogo de los Reyes godos de España extracted from Fernández Duro in his Colón y La Historia Postuma; says the friar: "In the year 1488, the Italian Christopher Columbus, native of Cugureo (Cogoleto) or Nervi, village of Genoa, sailor."
The Spaniard Juan de Castellanos, poet and chronicler, writes that Columbus was born in Nervi.
The Spaniard Juan de Mariana, writes: "Christopher Columbus, Genoese of nation."
The Portuguese Pedro de Mariz, historian and librarian, says that Columbus was Genoese.

Historians 

Most scholars agree that Columbus was Genoese.

Samuel Eliot Morison, in his book Christopher Columbus: Admiral of the Ocean Sea, notes that many existing legal documents demonstrate the Genoese origin of Columbus, his father Domenico, and his brothers Bartolomeo and Giacomo (Diego). These documents, written in Latin by notaries, were legally valid in Genoese courts. The documents, uncovered in the 19th century when Italian historians examined the Genoese archives, form part of the Raccolta Colombiana. On page 14, Morison writes:Besides these documents from which we may glean facts about Christopher's early life, there are others which identify the Discoverer as the son of Domenico the wool weaver, beyond the possibility of doubt. For instance, Domenico had a brother Antonio, like him a respectable member of the lower middle class in Genoa. Antonio had three sons: Matteo, Amigeto and Giovanni, who was generally known as Giannetto (the Genoese equivalent of "Johnny"). Giannetto, like Christopher, gave up a humdrum occupation to follow the sea. In 1496 the three brothers met in a notary's office at Genoa and agreed that Johnny should go to Spain and seek out his first cousin "Don Cristoforo de Colombo, Admiral of the King of Spain," each contributing one third of the traveling expenses. This quest for a job was highly successful. The Admiral gave Johnny command of a caravel on the Third Voyage to America, and entrusted him with confidential matters as well.

On the topic of Columbus's being born somewhere besides Genoa, Morison states: Every contemporary Spaniard or Portuguese who wrote about Columbus and his discoveries calls him Genoese. Four contemporary Genoese chroniclers claim him as a compatriot. Every early map on which his nationality is recorded describes him as Genoese or Ligur, a citizen of the Ligurian Republic. Nobody in the Admiral's lifetime, or for three centuries after, had any doubt about his birthplace.

Paolo Emilio Taviani, in his book Cristoforo Colombo: Genius of the Sea discusses "the public and notarial acts – original copies of which are conserved in the archives of Genoa and Savona – regarding Columbus's father, Columbus himself, his grandfather, and his relatives." In Columbus the Great Adventure he further claims that Columbus named the small island of Saona "to honor Michele da Cuneo, his friend from Savona."
This is fully accepted by Consuelo Varela Bueno, "Spain's leading authority on the texts, documents, and handwriting of Columbus." She devotes several pages to the question of Columbus native land, and concludes that "all chroniclers of that period wrote that he was from Liguria in northern Italy." The evidence supporting the Genoese origin of Columbus is also discussed by Miles H. Davidson. In his book Columbus Then and Now: A Life Reexamined, he writes:Diego Méndez, one of his captains, in testimony given in the ''Pleitos'', he said that Columbus was "Genoese, a native of Savona which is a town near Genoa." Those who reject this and the more than ample other contemporary evidence, given by both Italian and Spanish sources as well as by witnesses at these court hearings, are simply flying in the face of overwhelming evidence. [...] What is the reason behind so much futile speculation? It can be mostly attributed to parochialism. Each of the nations and cities mentioned wants to claim him for its own. Since no effort was made to locate the supporting data until the early nineteenth century, and since at that time not all of the archives had been adequately researched, there was, initially, justification for those early efforts to establish who he was and where he came from. To do so today is to fulfill Montaigne's maxim, "No one is exempt from talking non-sense; the misfortune is to do it solemnly."

Language 
The spoken language of Genova and the Ligurian coast would primarily have been the Ligurian language. The Italian language was originally based on the fourteenth century vernacular of Florence in the adjacent region of Tuscany, and would not have been the main spoken language of Genova in the fifteenth century.

Although Columbus wrote almost exclusively in Spanish, there is a small handwritten Genoese gloss in a 1498 Italian (from Venice) edition of Pliny's Natural History that he read after his second voyage to America: this shows Columbus was able to write in Genoese and read Italian. There is also a note in Italian in his own Book of Prophecies exhibiting, according to historian August Kling, "characteristics of northern Italian humanism in its calligraphy, syntax, and spelling". Phillips and Phillips point out that 500 years ago, the Romance languages had not distanced themselves to the degree they have today. Bartolomé de las Casas in his Historia de las Indias claimed that Columbus did not know Spanish well and that he was not born in Castile.

Valiant scholars have dedicated themselves to the subject of Christopher Columbus's language. They have conducted in-depth research both on the ship's log and on other writings of his that have come down to the modern day. They have analyzed the words, the terms, and the vocabulary, as well as rather frequent variations often bizarre in style, handwriting, grammar, and syntax. Christopher Columbus's language is Castilian punctuated by noteworthy and frequent Portuguese, Italian, and Genoese influences and elements.

Iberian origin

Crypto-Judaism 
Salvador de Madariaga argued in 1940 that Columbus was a marrano forced to leave Spain for Genoa. Scholars such as Jose Erugo, Celso Garcia de la Riega, Otero Sanchez and Nicholas Dias Perez have since concluded that Columbus may have had a Jewish background. This hypothesis is founded on many observations about Columbus, for example: his reference to the expulsion of the Jews in his first accounts, the reference to the Second Temple of Jerusalem by the Hebraic term "Second House", the Hebrew letters bet-hei (meaning B'ezrat hashem) on all but one of his letters to his son, and an anagram that was a cryptic substitute for the Kaddish, according to Cecil Roth. 

Secondly, another evidence is reflected by the fact that all the personalities who supported Columbus before the kings are of Jewish origin and that his voyage was mainly funded by two Jewish conversos and a prominent Jew: Luis de Santángel, Gabriel Sánchez (treasurer of the Crown of Aragón, d. 1505), and Don Isaac Abarbanel, respectively.

In a 1973 book, Simon Wiesenthal postulated that Columbus was a Sephardi, careful to conceal his Judaism yet also eager to locate a place of refuge for his persecuted fellow countrymen. Wiesenthal argued that Columbus's concept of sailing west to reach the Indies was less the result of geographical theories than of his faith in certain Biblical texts—specifically the Book of Isaiah. He repeatedly cited two verses from that book: "Surely the isles shall wait for me, and the ships of Tarshish first, to bring thy sons from far, their silver and their gold with them," (60:9); and "For behold, I create new heavens and a new earth" (65:17). Wiesenthal claimed that Columbus felt that his voyages had confirmed these prophecies. Jane Francis Amler shared those views in 1977. Estelle Irizarry echoed this as well, further noting that Columbus always wrote in Spanish, occasionally included Hebrew in his writing, and referenced the Jewish High Holidays in his journal during the first voyage.

A document suggests that Columbus belonged to a Marrano family from Majorcan origin. However the authenticity of the document hasn't been proved. The novelist Robert Graves argued: "his surname is still common in the island."

Catalan 
Since the early 20th century, researchers have attempted to connect Columbus to the Catalan-speaking areas of Spain, usually based on linguistic evidence. The first to propose a birthplace under the Crown of Aragon was Peruvian historian Luis Ulloa in a  book originally published in 1927 in French. Antonio Ballesteros Beretta, University of Madrid historian of America, said that Ulloa's "fiery imagination" had placed abstruse interpretations on court documents to support his thesis, had found no positive proof, and had dismissed as false any evidence supporting a Genoese origin.

Throughout Columbus's life, he referred to himself as Christobal Colom; his contemporaries and family also referred to him as such. This is opposed to the Genoese translation "Cristoffa Corombo", or even the Italian "Cristoforo Colombo". It is possible that Colom is the shortened form of the Italian surname Colombo (which means "dove"), although his surname in Genoese would have been Corombo. Colom can also be a Portuguese, French, or Catalan name, and in the latter means "dove". 
Some more recent studies also state Columbus had Catalan origins, based on his handwriting, though these have been disputed. Charles J. Merrill, a specialist in medieval Catalan literature at Mount St. Mary's University, claims Columbus's handwriting is typical of a native Catalan, and his mistakes in Castilian are "most likely" transfer errors from Catalan, with examples such as "a todo arreo" (a tot arreu), "todo de un golpe" (tot d'un cop), "setcentas" (set-centes), "nombre" (instead of número), "al sol puesto" (el sol post). Merrill states that the Genoese Cristoforo Colombo was a modest wool carder and cheese merchant with no maritime training and whose age does not match the one of Columbus. Merrill's book Colom of Catalonia was published in 2008.

Portugal 

Patrocínio Ribeiro claimed that Columbus was Portuguese in 1916, and Moisés Bensabat Amzalak hypothesized on Columbus's signature with the Kabbalah. Based on those theories, José Mascarenhas Barreto argued in 1988, that Columbus was a Portuguese agent who hatched up an elaborate diversion to keep the Spanish from the lucrative trade routes, and suggested he was born in Cuba, Portugal, while his real name was supposedly Salvador Fernandes Zarco. However, the genealogy presented has been disputed

Proponents of the Portuguese hypothesis also point to a court document which stated that Columbus's nationality was "Portuguese" and in another Columbus uses the words "my homeland" in relation to Portugal.

Other theories 
Other theories claim that Columbus was a Byzantine Greek nobleman, a Sardinian nobleman, a Norwegian, a Scot, or that he was the son of King Władysław III of Varna. Many cities have been hypothesized as the birthplace of Columbus, notably Calvi in Corsica, which in Columbus's times was under Genoese rule. 

British historian Felipe Fernández-Armesto, writes in his book:The Catalan, French, Galician, Greek, Ibizan, Jewish, Majorcan, Scottish, and other Columbuses concocted by historical fantasists are agenda-driven creations, usually inspired by a desire to arrogate a supposed or confected hero to the cause of a particular nation or historic community – or, more often than not, to some immigrant group striving to establish a special place of esteem in the United States. The evidence of Columbus's origins in Genoa is overwhelming: almost no other figure of his class or designation has left so clear a paper trail in the archives.

DNA study 
An international DNA study aimed at determining Columbus's origins was begun in 2021, using the remains in Seville.

Footnotes

References 

Columbus family
Christopher Columbus
Columbus, Christopher
Columbus, Christopher